The First Cabinet Müller (German: Kabinett Müller I or das erste Kabinett Müller) was the third democratically elected government of Germany and the second in office after the Weimar Constitution came into force in August 1919. It was named after the new Chancellor (Reichskanzler) Hermann Müller of the Social Democratic Party of Germany (SPD). The cabinet was based on the same three centre-left parties as the previous one: the SPD, the German Center Party (Zentrum) and the German Democratic Party (DDP). It was formed in March 1920 after the resignation of the Cabinet Bauer. The Cabinet Müller resigned in reaction to the outcome of the Reichstag elections of 6 June 1920.

Election and establishment
In late March 1920, when Reichspräsident (president) Friedrich Ebert (SPD) asked Hermann Müller (SPD) to form a new government, the parliament of Germany was still the Weimar National Assembly which served as the "acting Reichstag" according to Article 180 of the constitution. New elections for the Reichstag had yet to be held. The cabinet was based on the three centre-left parties that also made up the previous Cabinet Bauer: the SPD, the German Center Party (Zentrum) and the German Democratic Party (DDP). These parties accounted for 331 out of a total of 421 seats in the National Assembly and were also known as the Weimar Coalition.

The previous government, led by Gustav Bauer, also SPD, had become untenable and finally resigned on 27 March 1920 as a result of the Kapp-Lüttwitz Putsch. In the wake of the putsch's collapse, caused not least by a national general strike, the unions drew up an eight-point agenda as conditions for ending the strike. They demanded the punishment of the putschists, dissolution of associations hostile to the constitution, new social laws and the socialization of "appropriate" industries. They also demanded a right to participate in the creation of a new government. Although Otto Wels for the SPD rejected the harsh form in which Carl Legien had presented the unions' demands, the SPD accepted that both the current Reich government and the government of Prussia had been compromised and discredited by the putsch and would have to resign. The new government was to be based on politicians not tainted by the charge of having—voluntarily or involuntarily—aided and abetted the putsch. This was a position not shared by the SPD's coalition partners, however. The DDP did not see itself bound by any conditions the unions had attached to the ending of the general strike. Although the formation of a new government and restoring order in the Reich became increasingly pressing with the threat of a general uprising from the left (see Ruhr Uprising), the positions of the coalition partners seemed to move further apart.

On the left, both Legien and Rudolf Wissell were unwilling to become Chancellor. The eventual government to emerge thus largely ignored the eight points. No changes of coalition partners were possible. The right-wing DVP had disqualified itself by its behaviour during the putsch, the left-wing USPD insisted on a purely socialist government. Within the SPD, some favoured a coalition with the USPD, but the risk of a civil war or outright secession by some states in southern Germany was ultimately seen as too great. This decision ended all attempts to move ahead with the socialization project, promoted by many on the left like Rudolf Hilferding.

On 24 March, president Ebert called the leaders of the coalition parties to discuss the new cabinet. The SPD had settled on Hermann Müller as new Chancellor. The previous Chancellor, Bauer, although blamed by many for not having prevented the putsch, remained in the new cabinet but in the much lower profile job as Minister of the Treasury. Former Vice-Chancellor and Minister of Justice Eugen Schiffer (DDP), who had been in the forefront of those negotiating with the putschists, did not become a member of the new cabinet. However, many other ministers of the Cabinet Bauer remained. Müller had been Foreign Minister under Chancellor Bauer and retained that office until a replacement could be found in April 1920.

These were now filled by Joseph Wirth who took over at Finance and Bauer who became Minister of the Treasury. Notably absent from the new cabinet was Gustav Noske (SPD) who as Reichswehrminister (Defence) had been ultimately responsible for the (lack of a) military response to the Kapp-Lüttwitz-Putsch and who had been in charge of previous military action against left-wing uprisings. Although president Ebert wanted to keep Noske, the unions and many in the SPD demanded his resignation, arguing that he had been too ready to use force against the leftist uprisings and too lenient towards the right-wing putschists, both before and after the actual putsch.

It was difficult to find candidates for some positions. Otto Wels was considered for the Reichswehrministerium, but was told that his appointment would result in a mass-exodus of officers and thus withdrew. Wilhelm Cuno, offered the Finance Ministry, also declined. Otto Landsberg said he did not feel up to the job of leading the Foreign Office. Müller himself, who agreed only reluctantly to take on the chancellorship, at times considered handing back the task of forming a government.

Overview of the members
The members of the cabinet were as follows:

Resignation
After the events of the Kapp-Lüttwitz Putsch the date for the elections to a new Reichstag was brought forward to 6 June 1920. The cabinet resigned as a result of the outcome of these Reichstag elections. The SPD went from 163 seats in the National Assembly to just 102 in the new Reichstag. The number of people voting for the SPD plunged from 11.5 million in the January 1919 National Assembly elections to 6.1 million in June 1920. The share of votes cast for the three coalition parties shrunk from 76.1% in 1919 to 43.5%. Many on the left who had been disappointed with the biased way the SPD-led government had dealt with the right-wing and left-wing revolts in the spring, voted for the "independent" Social Democrats of the USPD instead. Its share of the popular vote rose from 7.6% in 1919 to 17.8% in 1920.

As the SPD remained the largest party in the Reichstag, president Ebert first asked Müller to form a new cabinet. Müller tried to convince the USPD to join a government, but its chairman refused to participate in any coalition that was not purely socialist and in which the USPD was not the majority party. As Müller was unwilling to work with the German People's Party (DVP), he handed back the task of forming a government.

Thus the "bourgeois" parties now decided to form a minority government without the Social Democrats. The SPD promised to support it in foreign policy and on questions of reparations to the Allies. The new government was formed by Constantin Fehrenbach of the Zentrum, previously president of the National Assembly. It was based on Zentrum, DDP and—for the first time—the centre-right DVP led by Gustav Stresemann, which had received 13.9% of the vote (up from 4.4% in 1919). It thus ended the period of government by the so-called "Weimar Coalition" that had been in office from February 1919 to June 1920.

Hermann Müller became Chancellor again in 1928 as the head of the Cabinet Müller II, the last "regular" government of the Weimar Republic before the Präsidialkabinette took over, i.e. governments not based on a Reichstag majority but on the support of the Reichspräsident (then Paul von Hindenburg).

References

Müller I
Müller
German Revolution of 1918–1919
1920 establishments in Germany
Cabinets established in 1920
Cabinets disestablished in 1920